Ammonium bromide, NH4Br, is the ammonium salt of hydrobromic acid. The chemical crystallizes in colorless prisms, possessing a saline taste; it sublimes on heating and is easily soluble in water. On exposure to air it gradually assumes a yellow color because of the oxidation of traces of bromide (Br−) to bromine (Br2).

Preparation 
Ammonium bromide can be prepared by the direct action of hydrogen bromide on ammonia. 
 NH3 + HBr → NH4Br

It can also be prepared by the reaction of ammonia with iron(II) bromide or iron(III) bromide, which may be obtained by passing aqueous bromine solution over iron filings.
 2 NH3 + FeBr2 + 2 H2O → 2 NH4Br + Fe(OH)2

Reactions 
Ammonium bromide is a weak acid with a pKa of ~5 in water. It is an acid salt because the ammonium ion hydrolyzes slightly in water.

Ammonium Bromide is strong electrolyte when put in water:
NH4Br(s) → NH4+(aq) + Br−(aq)

Ammonium bromide decomposes to ammonia and hydrogen bromide when heated at elevated temperatures:
 NH4Br → NH3 + HBr

Uses
Ammonium bromide is used for photography in films, plates and papers; in fireproofing of wood; in lithography and process engraving; in corrosion inhibitors; and in pharmaceutical preparations.

References 

Ammonium compounds
Bromides
Nonmetal halides